Bągart may refer to the following places:
Bągart, Chełmno County in Kuyavian-Pomeranian Voivodeship (north-central Poland)
Bągart, Wąbrzeźno County in Kuyavian-Pomeranian Voivodeship (north-central Poland)
Bągart, Pomeranian Voivodeship (north Poland)